Kila Airfield (also known as Kila Kila Airfield and 3-Mile Drome) is a former World War II airfield near Port Moresby, Papua New Guinea. It was part of a multiple-airfield complex in the Port Moresby area, located north of Joyce Bay, three miles from the town of Port Moresby near the village of Kila Kila.

The airfield was Port Moresby's first civilian airfield, built in 1933 by the Australian administration.

History
The airport was used by the Americans beginning in 1942 and expanded into an airfield for fighters, light bombers and service aircraft.  Many USAAF squadrons were briefly stationed at the airfield during the war, and major units assigned to Kila were:

 Headquarters, 3d Bombardment Group (January 28 – May 20, 1943)
 8th Bomb Squadron, A-20 Havoc
 13th Bomb Squadron, A-20 Havoc
 89th Bomb Squadron, A-20 Havoc
 90th Bomb Squadron, A-20 Havoc
 8th Fighter Squadron (49th Fighter Group), 25 September-15 April 1943, P-39 Airacobra
 80th Fighter Squadron (8th Fighter Group), 21 March-11 December 1943, P-39 Airacobra

A large hill on the approach to the field limited its usefulness. The runway was 5,000' × 100' surfaced with black loam with marston matting (as of October 8, 1943). A dispersal area with revetments and taxiways was located on the northern side of the runway. Several buildings were located at the center of the runway.

After the war the airfield was returned to the New Guinea government.  Today the airfield is now part of the Kila Police Barracks, a golf course and a technical school. Some of the wartime revetments remain on the police property and portions of the wartime taxiways and runway are visible.

See also

 USAAF in the Southwest Pacific
 Port Moresby Airfield Complex

 Wards Airfield (5 Mile Drome)
 Jackson Airfield (7 Mile Drome)
 Berry Airfield (12 Mile Drome)

 Schwimmer Airfield (14 Mile Drome)
 Durand Airfield (17 Mile Drome)
 Rogers (Rarona) Airfield (30 Mile Drome)
 Fishermans (Daugo Island) Airfield

References

 Maurer, Maurer (1983). Air Force Combat Units Of World War II. Maxwell AFB, Alabama: Office of Air Force History. .
 www.pacificwrecks.com

External links

Airfields of the United States Army Air Forces in Papua New Guinea
Airports established in 1933